= Opinion polling for the 1962 Canadian federal election =

This article is about polls leading up to the 1962 Canadian federal election.

== During the 24th Parliament of Canada ==
Evolution of voting intentions at national level
Polling firm	Last day of survey	Source	PC	LPC	NDP	Other	ME	Sample
Election 1962	June 18, 1962		37.22	36.97	13.57	12.24		
Gallup	May 1962		36	44	10	10	—	—
Gallup	May 1962		38	45	9	8	—	—
Gallup	March 1962		38	43	11	8	—	—
Gallup	December 1961		37	43	12	8	—	—
Gallup	September 1960		38	43	12	7	—	—
Gallup	June 1960		42	40	11	—	—	—
Gallup	May 1960		48	37	9	—	—	—
Election 1958	March 31, 1958		53.67	33.75	9.50 (Note: As the CCF)	3.08		

== Regional polling ==
=== Quebec ===
Evolution of voting intentions at national level
Polling firm	Last day of survey	Source	LPC	PC	SC	NDP	Other	ME	Sample
Election 1962	June 18, 1962		39.2	29.6	26.0	4.4	0.8		
Gallup	May 1962		52	25	19	—	—	—	—
Gallup	September 1960		55	34	—	—	—	—	—
Gallup	June 1960		47	41	—	3	—	—	—
Gallup	May 1960		45	47	—	3	—	—	—
Election 1958	March 31, 1958		45.6	49.6	0.6	2.3	1.9		

=== Ontario ===
Evolution of voting intentions at national level
Polling firm	Last day of survey	Source	LPC	PC	NDP	Other	ME	Sample
Election 1962	June 18, 1962		41.0	39.2	19.7	0.1		
Gallup	May 1962		48	39	11	—	—	—
Gallup	September 1960		42	44	—	—	—	—
Gallup	June 1960		40	48	10	—	—	—
Gallup	May 1960		37	54	8	—	—	—
Election 1958	March 31, 1958		32.1	56.4	10.5	1.0		

=== West ===
Evolution of voting intentions at national level
Polling firm	Last day of survey	Source	PC	LPC	NDP	Other	ME	Sample
Gallup	September 1960		34	31	—	—	—	
Gallup	June 1960		34	30	23	—	—	—
Gallup	May 1960		40	26	20	—	—	—

=== Maritimes ===
Evolution of voting intentions at national level
Polling firm	Last day of survey	Source	PC	LPC	NDP	Other	ME	Sample
Gallup	September 1960		49	44	—	—	—	—
Gallup	June 1960		49	44	4	—	—	—
Gallup	May 1960		51	44	3	—	—	—
